Brendan Mackay (born 7 June 1997) is a Canadian freestyle skier who competes internationally in the half-pipe discipline. He won the gold medal in the event at the 2023 freestyle skiing world championships.

Career
Mackay has been part of the national team since 2015.

During the 2021–22 World Cup Season, Mackay won medals in all three events: bronze in Copper Mountain followed by back-to-back gold medals in Calgary, leading him to finish first in the overall halfpipe standings.

On January 24, 2022, Mackay was named to Canada's 2022 Olympic team in the halfpipe event.

In 2023 he won the men's half-pipe gold medal at the freestyle skiing world championships in Bakuriani, Georgia.

References

External links 

1997 births
Living people
Canadian male freestyle skiers
Skiers from Calgary
Freestyle skiers at the 2022 Winter Olympics
Olympic freestyle skiers of Canada
X Games athletes